SM U-29 was a Type U-27 U-boat of the Imperial German Navy. She served during the First World War.

U-29s last commander was Captain Otto Weddigen.

Summary of raiding history

References

Notes

Citations

Bibliography

Type U 27 submarines
U-boats commissioned in 1914
U-boats sunk in 1915
World War I submarines of Germany
World War I shipwrecks in the North Sea
1913 ships
Ships built in Danzig
Ships lost with all hands
U-boats sunk by British warships
U-boats sunk in collisions